Patricia Hughes may refer to:

 Patricia Hughes (radio presenter) (1923–2013), British radio continuity announcer and news reader
 Patricia Hughes (politician), member of Philadelphia City Council
 Patricia Donoho Hughes (1930–2010), First Lady of Maryland